San Pedro Ocotepec is a town and municipality in Oaxaca in south-western Mexico. The municipality covers an area of 136.51 km². 
It is part of the Sierra Mixe district within the Sierra Norte de Oaxaca Region.

As of 2005, the municipality had a total population of 2,171, of whom 1,933 spoke an indigenous language.

References

Municipalities of Oaxaca